The women's shot put event at the 2000 World Junior Championships in Athletics was held in Santiago, Chile, at Estadio Nacional Julio Martínez Prádanos on 17 October.

Medalists

Results

Final
17 October

Participation
According to an unofficial count, 15 athletes from 12 countries participated in the event.

References

Shot put
Shot put at the World Athletics U20 Championships